Father Hilary's Holiday is a 1965 novel by Scottish writer Bruce Marshall.

Plot summary
After thirty years in the priesthood, Father Hilary seizes the opportunity to attend a religious congress in South America.  Father Hilary's well earned holiday is to be spent at a sort of ecumenical conference convened by "el Libertator" the Generalissimo of Tomasia. The result is a witty, pointed tale of humble but outspoken Franciscan friar and his wondrous escapades in the boiling maelstrom of a mythical Latin American dictatorship.

References

1965 British novels
Novels by Bruce Marshall
Catholic novels
Novels set in South America
Novels set in fictional countries
Constable & Co. books